Lomi or Pancit Lomi is a Chinese-Filipino noodle dish.

Lomi or LOMI may also refer to:
 Lomi salmon, a side dish in Pacific island cuisine
 lomilomi massage, Hawaiian massage 
 LOMI or St. Petersburg Department of Steklov Institute of Mathematics of Russian Academy of Sciences
 Aurelio Lomi (1556 - 1622), Italian painter 
 Lomi Hydroelectric Power Station, a hydroelectric power station in Nordland county, Norway